The Mesa Schoolhouse, near Steamboat Springs, Colorado, was built in 1916.  It was listed on the National Register of Historic Places in 2007.

It was used as a schoolhouse during 1916 to 1959, and had a large classroom and a small art room and library.  It was used as a residence during the 1960s, 70s, and 80s.  It was acquired by the City of Steamboat Springs in 1998.

It is a one-story  structure.

References

Schools in Colorado
National Register of Historic Places in Routt County, Colorado
Late 19th and Early 20th Century American Movements architecture
School buildings completed in 1916
1916 establishments in Colorado
School buildings on the National Register of Historic Places in Colorado